Marie Gabert was a World Series of Poker champion in the 1990 $500 Ladies - Limit 7 Card Stud.

As of 2018, her total tournament winnings exceed $400,000.

World Series of Poker bracelets

References

American poker players
World Series of Poker bracelet winners
Female poker players
Living people
Year of birth missing (living people)